Raymond J. Gagné (born August 27, 1935) is an American entomologist whose work focuses on gall midges.

He was born in Meriden, Connecticut, and earned degrees from University of Connecticut, Iowa State University, and University of Minnesota. He has authored at least 230 scientific publications and described 68 genera and 332 species. Most of his work has been done as part of the USDA Systematic Entomological Laboratory at the Smithsonian Museum of Natural History.

The wood midge genus Gagnea was named in his honor.

References

American entomologists
Dipterists
Living people
1935 births